Oyster plant is a common name used for various flowering plants, including:

Acanthus mollis, (also called bear's breeches), native to the Mediterranean
Mertensia maritima (also called oysterleaf), native to Europe and North America with leaves said to taste like oysters
Scorzonera hispanica (also called black salsify), cultivated for its dark-skinned edible root
Tragopogon porrifolius (also called purple salsify), cultivated for its light-skinned edible root
Tradescantia spathacea (synonyms Tradescantia discolor, Rhoeo spathacea, Rhoeo discolor); (also called Oyster Herb, Daun Kepah, Nanas Kerang, Boatlily (Cây Lẻ Bạn, Lảo Bạn, Sò Huyết), Moses in a basket, Cradle Lily, Moses in His Cradle, Moses on a Raft, Moses in the Bulrushes, Men in a Boat, Moses-in-Cradle, (Chinese) 蚌花)